In the theory of causal structure on Lorentzian manifolds, Geroch's theorem or Geroch's splitting theorem (first proved by Robert Geroch) gives a topological characterization of globally hyperbolic spacetimes.

The theorem
Let  be a globally hyperbolic spacetime. Then  is strongly causal and there exists a global "time function" on the manifold, i.e. a continuous, surjective map  such that:
For all ,  is a Cauchy surface, and
 is strictly increasing on any causal curve.

Theorems in general relativity
Lorentzian manifolds
Theorems in mathematical physics